The Williams FW37 is a Formula One racing car designed by Williams Grand Prix Engineering which Williams Martini Racing used to compete in the 2015 Formula One season. It was driven by Valtteri Bottas and Felipe Massa.  It proved to be competitive, with both drivers scoring 4 podiums, and finishing the 2015 season in 3rd.

The car was launched on 1 February 2015.

Background and design 
Williams were first in presenting their 2015 car, releasing a computer rendering on 21 January 2015. The peculiar 'anteater' nose design of the 2014 car was dropped in favour of a lower and shorter one. The Williams team retained the Martini alcohol brand as their main sponsor, thereby keeping the car in the traditional Martini Racing colours.

Racing history 
A reasonably competitive car that finished in the points at almost every race, it ultimately helped the team secure its second consecutive third-place finish with 257 points in the Constructors' Championship. The team achieved 4 podium finishes, two each for both Massa and Bottas. The team proved arguably less competitive late in the season as they shifted development towards the 2016 car relatively early. The car though was still highly competitive, it did not score as many points as its predecessor and was overshadowed by Mercedes and a resurgent Scuderia Ferrari

Complete Formula One results
(key)

 Driver failed to finish the race, but was classified as they had completed greater than 90% of the race distance.

References

External links

2015 Formula One season cars
Williams Formula One cars